Passport to Danger is a Nancy Drew and Hardy Boys Supermystery crossover novel.  It is the 19th book in the series and was first published in July 1994 by Archway Paperbacks.

In the story, Nancy heads to San Miguel de Allende, Mexico, a small town where the Obermans, a couple running an art school, suspect a plan involving counterfeit visas being used to smuggle Mexican citizens into the U.S. Meanwhile, the Hardys must retrieve a priceless mask from an art thief in Mexico City, and return it to a local family's art museum. Nancy and the boys must find a connection, and solve the mystery.

References

External links
Passport to Danger by Carolyn Keene at Fantastic Fiction
Supermystery series books

Supermystery
1994 American novels
1994 children's books
Novels set in Mexico
Guanajuato